Mountains in Utah are numerous and have varying elevations and prominences.

Kings Peak, in the Uinta Mountains in Duchesne County, Utah, is the highest point in the state and has the greatest prominence. It has elevation  and prominence .

For lists of the top 50 peaks in Utah by elevation, prominence, and topographic isolation, see List of mountain peaks of Utah.  This "List of mountains in Utah" should include all of those (but does not yet) and more.

To see locations of all mountains having coordinates in this article (primarily from just three counties in the state, so far) together in one map, click on "Map all coordinates using OSM" at the right side of this page.

Partial lists of mountains in just a few of Utah's 29 counties are below.

Salt Lake County

Mountains in Salt Lake County, Utah include:

Utah County

Mountains in Utah County, Utah include:

Emery County

Emery County, Utah has 185 named peaks.

The following table includes the 10 mountains having highest elevation and the 10 mountains having highest prominence (with Candland Mountain, Cedar Mountain, East Mountain, and Monument Peak being in both top 10s). And it includes selected other mountains in Emery County (including Factory Butte (Emery County, Utah)).  These Emery County mountains are:

See also

List of mountain peaks of Utah (top 50 peaks in Utah by elevation, by prominence, and by topographic isolation)
List of mountain ranges of Utah
List of mountains in the United States

References

Utah
 
Mountains
Buttes of Utah